Pangwali is a Western Pahari language of Himachal Pradesh, India. It is spoken in the Pangi Tehsil of Chamba district, and is threatened to go extinct. Pangwali is natively written in the Takri script, but Devanagari is used as well. It is much similar with the Padderi language of Padder, J&K.

Classification 
The linguist George Abraham Grierson recorded Pangwali as a dialect of Chambeali in his Linguistic Survey of India. It is now regarded as a language in its own right as a part of the Chamealic group of Western Pahari, affiliated with Chambeali, Bilaspuri, Bhadarwahi, among others.

Pangwali has about 90% inherent intelligibility with Padderi, 64% with Mandeali, 52% with Kangri, 44% with Chambeali, and 50% with Bhadarwahi. Its lexical similarity is 55% with Hindi, 77% with Kullu Pahari, and 45% with Bhadarwahi.

Phonology 

Pangwali exhibits a fossilized system of vowel harmony as other languages of the area (such as Kashmiri) do. The original conditioning vowels that caused harmony have often been lost, so the system is no longer productive.

Grammar 
Since Grierson's sketch of Pangwali, there has been only recently published a grammar of Pangwali written in Hindi by Binaya Sundar Nayak. Both are referenced in this article.

Nouns 
Pangwali nouns have grammatical gender, with the two genders being masculine and feminine.

Case markers

Numerals

Geographical distribution

Status 
The language is commonly called Pahari or Himachali. Some speakers may even call it a dialect of Punjabi or Dogri. The language has no official status. According to the United Nations Education, Scientific and Cultural Organisation (UNESCO), the language is of critically endangered category, i.e. the youngest speakers of Pangwali are generally grandparents or older and they too speak it infrequently or partially.

The demand for the inclusion of 'Pahari (Himachali)' under the Eight Schedule of the Constitution, which is supposed to represent multiple Pahari languages of Himachal Pradesh, had been made in the year 2010 by the state's Vidhan Sabha. There has been no positive progress on this matter since then even when small organisations strive to save the language and demand it. Due to political interest, the language is currently recorded as a dialect of Hindi, even when having a poor mutual intelligibility with it and having a higher mutual intelligibility with other recognised languages like Dogri and other Western Pahari languages.

At the time of the Linguistic Survey of India, 3,701 speakers were estimated of Pangwali.

Dialects 
Following are the dialects of the language:

 Killar
 Purthi
 Sach
 Dharwasi

Killar, being the headquarter of the Tehsil, is the dialect which is widely understood. Sach dialect is said to be the most conservative in regards to Sanskrit.

Literature 
Tubari Magazine is a recent effort to maintain the language. The magazine uses Devanagari Script. There are other publications which generally describe the language.

Idioms

References 

Northern Indo-Aryan languages
Languages of Himachal Pradesh
Endangered languages of India